The toy piano, also known as the kinderklavier (child's keyboard), is a small piano-like musical instrument. Most modern toy pianos use round metal rods, as opposed to strings in a regular piano, to produce sound. The U.S. Library of Congress recognizes the toy piano as a unique instrument with the subject designation, Toy Piano Scores: M175 T69. The most famous example of a dedicated composition for the instrument is the "Suite for Toy Piano" (1948) by John Cage.

Characteristics 
Toy pianos come in many shapes, from scale models of upright or grand pianos to toys which only resemble pianos in that they possess keys. Toy pianos are usually no more than 50 cm in width, and made out of wood or plastic. The first toy pianos were made in the mid-19th century and were typically uprights, although many toy pianos made today are models of grands. Rather than hammers hitting strings as on a standard piano, the toy piano sounds by way of hammers hitting metal bars or rods which are fixed at one end. The hammers are connected to the keys by a mechanism similar to that which drives celestas.

Toy pianos ostensibly use the same musical scale as full size pianos, although their tuning in all but the most expensive models is usually very approximate. Similarly, the pitch to which they are tuned is rarely close to the standard of 440 Hz for the A above middle C. A typical toy piano will have a range of one to three octaves. The cheapest models may not have black keys, or the black keys may be painted on. This means they can play a fixed diatonic scale (or an approximately tuned version of it), but not the full chromatic scale, or diatonic scales in other keys. Typically, diatonic toy pianos have only eight keys and
can play one octave. Other variants may have non-functioning black keys between every key (which would make it appear to play the quarter tones between E/F and B/C), but they either do not play, play the same notes as an adjacent white key, or play a special sound effect. Some toy pianos cost hundreds of dollars.

History 
Early toy pianos used glass bars to produce their sound, but Albert Schoenhut, son of a German toy-making family, introduced metal sounding bars to make the instrument more durable. One popular model used metal xylophone bars, struck by a wooden sphere thrown up by the piano key to make its sound. In 1866 he was offered employment in Philadelphia, United States, to repair German toy pianos which had been damaged in transit. In 1872 he established the Schoenhut Piano Company to manufacture toy pianos, diversifying into other instruments.  By 1917, Schoenhut produced a catalog showing 10 pages of upright and grand pianos of all shapes and sizes, with one page devoted to miniature piano stools alone. The models had nicknames beginning with "P", such as Packer, Padder, Papa and Poet. Keys were made of imitation ivory. By 1935, Schoenhut had produced over 40 styles and sizes of toy piano, with prices ranging from 50 cents to 25 dollars.

In 1930, a toy piano metal rod design was patented by Alice Violet Bennett.
   
During the 1950s, J. Chein & Company of Burlington, NJ manufactured the PianoLodeon, a child's piano remarkable for the fact that it operated by a mechanism closely related to an actual player piano. The child could play the keys or let a small piano roll take over, the metal rods being struck by hammers propelled by a vacuum driven by a blower. In the 1960s, the Tomy Toy Company offered the Tuneyville Player Piano using organ music, in which air blows through pipes. The child can play the keys manually or insert a plastic disk to play a recognizable tune.

By the 1950s, the toy piano market was dominated by two main toy piano makers: Jaymar and Schoenhut, counterparts to the Steinway and Baldwin for adult pianos. Wooden keys and hammers were replaced by moulded plastic ones. In the late 1970s, Schoenhut was acquired by Jaymar, although the two retained their distinct identities. Jaymar/Schoenhut experienced difficulty during the recession of the 1980s, folding and eventually re-emerging as the Schoenhut Piano Company in 1997. Today, Schoenhut Piano Company is still the leading manufacturer, with other toy piano manufacturers: Hering from Brazil, Zeada from China, and New Classic Toys from Netherlands.

From 1939 to 1970, Victor Michel improved toy-piano conception. Michelsonne French toy-pianos are known for their uniquely distinctive sound.

Launched in 2000, the annual Toy Piano Festival, held in San Diego at the University of California, San Diego's Geisel Library, features a collection of toy pianos, recordings of compositions, and live performance of existing and new works written for toy pianos. The Festival influenced the Library of Congress to designate, in 2001, a dedicated subject heading and call number, Toy Piano Scores: M175 T69.

Use in musical performance and popular culture 

Though originally made as a child's toy, the toy piano has been used in serious classical and contemporary musical contexts. The most famous example is the "Suite for Toy Piano" (1948) by John Cage. Other works in classical music for the instrument include "Ancient Voices of Children" by George Crumb and a number of pieces by Mauricio Kagel. "Streicher, Tasti et Bizarreries" (2019) by Bijan Olia uses toy piano and melodica in addition to piano quartet. Steve Beresford has used toy pianos (along with many other toy instruments) in his improvised music.
 British experimental composers use the toy piano frequently, especially the Promenade Theatre Orchestra (1969–73), a quartet of composer/performers (members included John White, Alec Hill, Hugh Shrapnel, and Christopher Hobbs), whose central instrumentation consisted of four matched French Michelsonne  toy pianos and Hohner reed organs.  Their music was, broadly, repetitive minimalism, often of great technical difficulty (Hobbs's Working Notes (1969) for four toy pianos), great dynamic power (Shrapnel's 4 Toy Pianos (1971)), were used in various combinations with reed organs, and used compositional techniques that were either specific to British experimentalism (such as systems music, invented by John White), or borrowed from other disciplines (such as Alec Hill's use of change ringing systems).
 In France in the early 1970s, Jean-Jacques Birgé performed on a toy-piano, besides synthesizers, and recorded it in "Le réveil" on his Défense de album in 1975, as Pascal Comelade built all his work on toy instruments, having played all kinds of toy pianos himself since 1978. Yann Tiersen played the instrument in his first album La Valse des Monstres (Monsters' Waltz, 1995). He also uses the toy piano to musically recreate the childhood of the main character in the French movie Amélie, which features a soundtrack composed mostly by him.
 A pioneer of the toy piano is the German composer and pianist Bernd Wiesemann. He played many concerts with the toy piano in Germany in the 1970s and 1980s. In 1993 he released the CD Neue Musik für Kinderklavier ("New Music for Toy Piano"), containing compositions by John Cage, Karlheinz Stockhausen, Ratko Delorko, Andreas Kunstein, Frank Scholzen, Joachim Herbold, Carlos Cruz de Castro, Francisco Estevez and himself. In 2004 he released the SACD Das untemperierte Klavier ("the not-so-well-tempered piano", a play on Bach's Well-Tempered Clavier), containing new contemporary works.
 Richard Carpenter used a toy piano as one of five keyboard instruments (the others being a grand piano, upright piano, console piano, and harpsichord) he played in his rendition of Zez Confrey's instrumental "Dizzy Fingers". Carpenter would run from instrument to instrument between each section of the song, which was performed for the TV special The Carpenters: Music, Music, Music. In addition to that, he also used a toy piano on The Carpenters' interpretation of The Rainbow Connection.
 Neil Diamond's song Shilo used a toy piano to play a six-note solo during the instrumental section, but on the version released on a rerelease of his 1968 album Velvet Gloves & Spit, a harpsichord was used instead.
 In 1997, pianist Margaret Leng Tan released the CD The Art of the Toy Piano. On it, she plays a number of pieces written specially for the toy piano as well as arrangements of other pieces, including Ludwig van Beethoven's "Moonlight Sonata" and The Beatles' "Eleanor Rigby". In 2010, she released The Art of The Toy Piano II. A documentary directed by Evans Chan entitled Sorceress of the New Piano explores the music making of Tan and had its American debut at the San Francisco Asian American Film Festival in 2005.
 Walter Egan uses a melody line played on a toy piano for the choruses on his 1978 hit "Magnet And Steel".
 Mannheim Steamroller featured a toy piano in their song "Midnight On a Full Moon" from the album Fresh Aire III (1979).
 On 2005's Awake Is the New Sleep, Ben Lee used a toy piano in the song "Catch My Disease"  which became popular in 2005 and won several awards.
 Some jazz performers—John Medeski and Larry Goldings, among others—have used toy pianos.
 The toy piano has been used extensively by alternative rock and post-rock bands such as Agitpop, Evanescence, Radiohead, Little Bang Theory, Warren Zevon, Tori Amos, Sigur Rós, Vampire Weekend, Clap Your Hands Say Yeah, A Perfect Circle, Old Canes, Alt-J (notably in "Breezeblocks"), and The Dresden Dolls. Matty Pop Chart has a song on his CD Good Old Water composed entirely on a toy piano.
 The Cure used a toy piano on "Just Like Heaven" during their 1990 MTV Unplugged set.
 A toy piano provides the pulsing chime in the song "I Belong To You" by Lenny Kravitz from his 5 album.
 The B-52's song "Dance This Mess Around" features a Mickey Mouse Piano Book played by Fred Schneider as both an essential musical plot device and live prop.
 In 2005 Matt Malsky and David Claman sponsored "The Extensible Toy Piano Project", which consisted of an extensive set of freely-available, high-quality toy piano samples, an international composition competition, and a festival at Clark University. One of the winners was Karlheinz Essl with his piece "Kalimba" for Toy Piano and CD playback.
 The instrumental "Calliope", on Tom Waits' album Blood Money, features a toy piano, as well as the calliope of the title.
 The London band Athlete used a toy piano for the intro of their track "Superhuman Touch".
 The rock band Primus used the toy piano (played by Matt "Exxon" Winegar) in the song "Sathington Willoughby" on their album Frizzle Fry.
 The band They Might Be Giants used a toy piano in their song "O We" from their 2011 album, They Might Be Giants Album Raises New And Troubling Questions.
 Composer Michael Hearst uses the toy piano (performed by Margaret Leng Tan) on his song "Jesus Christ Lizard," on the album Songs For Unusual Creatures.
 In 1972, on Seals and Crofts' US Top 10 Pop hit, "Summer Breeze," one of the distinctive backing instruments is a toy piano.
 American musical duo Pomplamoose employs a toy piano performed by Jack Conte in many of their musical covers uploaded on YouTube.
 Schroeder (Peanuts comics) uses the instrument to play renditions of Beethoven classics.
 A toy piano is played at the end of "Your Body Is A Wonderland" by John Mayer.
 A toy piano is played at the end of the 2022 music video for "Yen" by Slipknot.
 Peanuts character, Schroeder, plays the toy piano as his instrument of choice.

Further reading 
 Williams, Maggie: Child's Play; International Piano Magazine, March/April:2007, 46-47.
 Loffredo, Antonietta: The Toy Piano. From the Playroom to the Concert Platform.  Bologna: Ut Orpheus, 2018. -

See also
 Lamellophone

References

External links
 UnCaged Toy Piano organisation and festival
 Play online an old Michelsonne toy-piano composer and instrument maker
 The Miniature Piano Museum, Page 7: Toy Pianos A private collector's gallery of photographs of toy pianos, with descriptions

Educational toys
Keyboard instruments
Piano
Plaque percussion idiophones
Toy instruments and noisemakers
Traditional toys